Wat Phnom Daily is a Khmer language newspaper published in Cambodia with its headquarters in Phnom Penh. 

Khmer-language newspapers
Newspapers published in Cambodia
Mass media in Phnom Penh
Publications with year of establishment missing